Kristinestad City Hall (Swedish: Kristinestads rådhus, Finnish: Kristiinankaupungin raatihuone) is the municipal headquarters building of Kristinestad (Kristiinankaupunki) on the west coast of Finland. The present city hall is the fourth in Kristinestad.

The building was designed in the neoclassical style by a leading architect of public buildings in the mid-19th century Finland, Ernst Lohrmann, and completed in 1865. It is of masonry construction, and comprises two storeys with a central clock tower.

References

Ernst Lohrmann buildings
Buildings and structures in Ostrobothnia (region)
Buildings and structures completed in 1865
Neoclassical architecture in Finland
City and town halls in Finland